Imbo may refer to:
 Disappearance of Danielle Imbo and Richard Petrone Jr.
 Imbo Ungu, a dialect of the Kaugel language
 Imbo railway station, a railway station in Russia